Woodburn station was a train station in Woodburn, Oregon.

History
Woodburn was originally a station on the Southern Pacific Cascade Line, with regular service by the Klamath and Rogue River.

Amtrak served the city from 1980 to 1981. The stop was located between Lincoln and Young Streets. The station was served by the Willamette Valley and Mount Rainier.

References 

Woodburn, Oregon
Former Amtrak stations in Oregon
Former Southern Pacific Railroad stations in Oregon
Railway stations in the United States opened in 1980
Railway stations closed in 1981
Transportation buildings and structures in Marion County, Oregon